The Machinery Directive, Directive 2006/42/EC of the European Parliament and of the Council of 17 May 2006 is a European Union directive concerning machinery and certain parts of machinery. Its main intent is to ensure a common safety level in machinery placed on the market or put in service in all member states and to ensure freedom of movement within the European Union by stating that "member states shall not prohibit, restrict or impede the
placing on the market and/or putting into service in their territory of machinery which complies with [the] Directive".

European economic directives 

Economic directives apply to products. They were taken under the new approach in order to facilitate the free movement of goods and products in the European Union by removing barriers to trade in the European market. The particularity of these guidelines is that they set the basic requirements or Essential Health and Safety Requirements (EHSR) that apply to all manufacturers who wish to put their products on the European market. If a product meets the essential health and safety requirements, then the product can be placed on the market.

One way of demonstrating compliance with the ESHR can be done through compliance with harmonized European standards or any other solution that allows demonstrating a similar level of safety.

Consequently, the Machinery Directive belongs to the economic legislation. It applies to products designed to be sold (or enabled) in the European Union for the first time. It addresses manufacturers, importers, and dealers of machinery and safety components and applies to new equipment. This directive harmonizes the level of safety of products designed and manufactured by different manufacturers. Already installed machines lie outside the scope of this Directive, because they are already on the market. Resale of used machines is governed by national laws.

Scope 

The directive applies to machinery as well as interchangeable equipment, safety components, lifting accessories, chains/ropes/webbing, removable mechanical transmission devices and partly completed machinery.

Machinery that is covered by more specific directives is excluded from the scope of this directive. The machinery excluded from the scope includes:

 agricultural and forestry tractors
 motor vehicles and their trailers
 certain electric and electronic products such as household appliances or office equipment

First Publication 

The first publication of the Machinery Directive took place in 1989 – Directive 89/392/EEC of 14/06/89 published in OJ L 183 of 06.29.89 according to Article 100a of the Rome Treaty. The date of entry into force of this Directive was 1 January 1993, with a mandatory effective date of 1 January 1995.

The following directives were subsequently introduced amending Directive 89/392/EEC.

 Directive 91/368/EEC, which extended the scope of the Machinery Directive to interchangeable equipment, machinery moving and lifting machinery (excluding people). Therefore, Annex I has been expanded (adding / modifying parts 3, 4 and 5 of Annex I of the Directive).
  Directive 93/44/EEC, which extended the scope of the Machinery Directive:
 safety components,
 Machinery intended for lifting,
 the movement of people.
 Directive 93/68/EEC has introduced harmonized provisions relating to "CE" marking.

Second Publication 

A second publication of the Machinery Directive took place in 1998 – Directive 98/37/EC of 22 June 1998 on the harmonization of the laws of all Member States relating to machinery. This directive is the codified version of Directive 89/392/EEC as amended by the directives listed above.

Machine Directive 1998/37/EC This was amended by the following directive:
 Directive 98/79/EC has been a minor amendment relating to the exclusion of medical devices.
Machinery Directive 98/37/EC remained in force until 29 December 2009.

Third Publication 

The third publication of the Machinery Directive took place in 2006 – called new Directive 2006/42/EC, and was adopted in April and 9 June 2006, published in the Official Journal of the EU.

The first recital of Directive 2006/42/EC notes that this "new Machinery Directive " is not entirely new, but is based on Directive 98/37/EC which itself has codified Directive "Machinery" 89/392/EEC amended by Directives 91/368/EEC, 93/44/EEC, 93/68/EEC and 98/79/EC.

Requirements of the new Machinery Directive were transcribed into national law of each country of the European Union (transcript had to be made before 29 June 2008) so that this new machine Directive shall apply starting from 29 December 2009 and replaces Machinery Directive 98/37/EC.

Requirements of this new machinery directive and associated European regulations concerns both manufacturers of machine and safety components, machinery distributors and users. The new Directive 2006/42/EC lays down the foundation and regulatory basis for the harmonization of Essential Health and Safety Requirements (EHSR) in the field of machinery at the Community level.

No transition period took place in 2009, because manufacturers had more than three years to anticipate these developments and be aware of new requirements.

Changes in relation to the Essential Health and Safety Requirements (EHSR) of the previous directive do not deeply change the Essential Health and Safety Requirements (EHSR).

References 

 Harmonized standards - Machinery (MD)
Europa website on Machinery

European Union directives